Didier Dheedene (born 22 January 1972) is a Belgian former professional footballer who played as a left back and central defender.

He played twelve times for the Belgium national football team. At club level he played for Royal Cappellen, K.F.C. Germinal Beerschot in Antwerp, FK Austria Wien, TSV 1860 Munich and RSC Anderlecht.

Honours
Germinal Ekeren
 Belgian Cup: 1996–97

Anderlecht
Belgian First Division A: 1999–2000, 2000–01
Belgian Super Cup: 2000

References

External links
 

1972 births
Living people
Association football defenders
Belgian footballers
Belgium international footballers
Belgian expatriate footballers
Beerschot A.C. players
R.S.C. Anderlecht players
TSV 1860 Munich players
FK Austria Wien players
Royal Cappellen F.C. players
Belgian Pro League players
Bundesliga players
Austrian Football Bundesliga players
Expatriate footballers in Germany
Expatriate footballers in Austria